A nonose is a monosaccharide with nine carbons.

Nonoses types 
Depending on the position of the functional groups, a distinction is made between ketononoses and aldononoses.

Aldononoses have seven chiral centers, which allows the formation of 128 stereoisomers (27), which differ in the position of the hydroxyl groups or the asymmetric carbon atom. Ketononoses have six chiral centers, which gives the possibility of 64 different possible stereoisomers.

Nonoses families 
 Neuraminic acid
 Sialic acid
 Legionaminic acid
 Pseudaminic acid

References 

Monosaccharides